Ihenga was an early Māori explorer, according to Te Arawa folklore. He is credited with exploring and naming many towns and natural features throughout the North Island.

He was the grandson of Tama-te-kapua, who was the captain of the Te Arawa canoe. Tama-te-kapua and his relatives set out for New Zealand from Hawaiki in a waka. They explored the coast of the North Island before settling in Maketu in the western Bay of Plenty. Ihenga then traveled south and settled around the Rotorua lakes.

He first discovered Kaituna, "the chiefly river". From there, his dogs went searching for food and returned with whitebait, prompting Ihenga to search for the nearby water source, which he found and named Te Roto-iti-kite-a-Ihenga, "the little lake seen by Ihenga", now known as Lake Rotoiti. He later discovered and named Lake Rotorua, Te Rotoruanui-a-Kahumatamomoe, or "the second great lake of Kahumatamomoe"  and the island Mokoia. He settled in Ngongotahā.

Ihenga was married to Hinetekakara, the daughter of Kahumatamomoe, and they had a daughter called Hinetekakara. According to legend, the daughter was captured and killed, and her remains were thrown into Lake Rotorua. Ihenga later found the remains at the edge of the lake, and he placed a memorial stone that he named Ōhinemutu, "the end of the girl".

References 

Legendary Māori people
New Zealand Māori people
Arawa (canoe)
Legendary Polynesian people